Salton or Saltoun may refer to:

Places
 East Saltoun and West Saltoun, Scotland
 Salton, North Yorkshire, England
 Salton City, California
 Salton Sea
 Salton Sink
 Salton Trough

Other uses
 Salton (surname), a surname
 Salton Inc., a manufacturer of home appliances

See also
 Salton Sea (disambiguation)